John Christian (23 January 1700 – 20 July 1733; in German: Johann Christian Joseph) was the Count Palatine of Sulzbach from 1732–33. He was the second and youngest surviving son of duke Theodore Eustace, Count Palatine of Sulzbach (1659–1732) with his consort Eleonore Maria Amalia of Hesse-Rotenburg (1675–1720). His elder brother was Joseph Charles, Count Palatine of Sulzbach.

Life
After the death of his elder brother Joseph Charles, John Christian Joseph became the eventual designated heir of the Electoral Palatine. In 1732 he succeeded his father as Count Palatine of Sulzbach, but died in Sulzbach in 1733 before inheriting the Palatinate.
Charles III Philip, Elector Palatine, a member of the Palatine Neuburg line of Wittelsbach failed to produce a legitimate male heir, and his brothers also. By 1716 it was evident that the Neuburg line would become extinct and that the Sulzbach branch would succeed them.

Marriage
He married twice:
 Marie Anne Henriëtte Leopoldine de La Tour d'Auvergne (24 October 1708 – 28 July 1728), daughter of Francois Egon de la Tour d'Auvergne, Prince of Auvergne, and had the following children:
 Charles Theodore (11 December 1724 – 16 February 1799); became Elector Palatine in 1742, and Elector of Bavaria in 1777
 Maria Anne (30 May 1728 – 25 June 1728)

 Eleonore Philippina Christina Sophia of Hesse-Rotenburg  (1712-1759); married on 1731 but had no issue.

Ancestry

1700 births
1733 deaths
House of Wittelsbach
Counts Palatine of Sulzbach
People from Sulzbach-Rosenberg
Hereditary Princes of Sulzbach
Place of birth missing